Fragility may refer to:
 A property of a solid, related to brittleness
 Fragility (glass physics), a concept to characterize viscous slow down during glass formation
 Fragility of financial systems, an idea developed by scholar Nassim Nicholas Taleb
 Fragility Tour, a 1999 concert tour by rock band Nine Inch Nails
 Fragility (film), a 2016 Swedish documentary film
 Fragility (cultural studies)
 White fragility

See also
 Fragile States Index